The Jin dynasty or the Jin Empire, sometimes distinguished as the  (司馬晉) or the  (兩晉), was an imperial dynasty of China that existed from 266 to 420. It was founded by Sima Yan (Emperor Wu), eldest son of Sima Zhao, who had previously been declared the King of Jin. The Jin dynasty was preceded by the Three Kingdoms period, and was succeeded by the Sixteen Kingdoms in northern China and the Liu Song dynasty in southern China.

There are two main divisions in the history of the dynasty. The  (266–316) was established as the successor to Cao Wei after Sima Yan usurped the throne from Cao Huan. The capital of the Western Jin was initially in Luoyang, though it later moved to Chang'an (modern Xi'an, Shaanxi province). In 280, after conquering Eastern Wu, the Western Jin reunited China proper for the first time since the end of the Han dynasty, ending the Three Kingdoms era. However, 11 years later, a series of civil wars known as the War of the Eight Princes erupted in the dynasty, which weakened it considerably. Subsequently, in 304, the dynasty experienced a wave of rebellions and invasions by non-Han ethnicities termed the Five Barbarians, who went on to establish several short-lived dynastic states in northern China. This inaugurated the chaotic and bloody Sixteen Kingdoms era of Chinese history, in which states in the north rose and fell in rapid succession, constantly fighting both one another and the Jin. Han Zhao, one of the northern states established during the disorder, sacked Luoyang in 311, captured Chang'an in 316, and executed Emperor Min of Jin in 318, ending the Western Jin era. The Eastern Jin dynasty remained in near-constant conflict with the northern states for most of its existence, and it launched several invasions of the north with the aim of recovering its lost territories. Notably, in 383, the Eastern Jin inflicted a devastating defeat on the Former Qin, a Di-ruled state that had briefly unified northern China. In the aftermath of that battle, the Former Qin state splintered, and Jin armies recaptured the lands south of the Yellow River. The Eastern Jin was eventually usurped by General Liu Yu in 420 and replaced with the Liu Song dynasty. The Eastern Jin dynasty is considered the second of the Six Dynasties.

History

Background

During the Three Kingdoms period, the Sima clan—with its most accomplished individual being Sima Yi—rose to prominence within the kingdom of Cao Wei, which dominated northern China and was ruled by the Cao clan. Sima Yi was the regent of Cao Wei, and after he instigated a 249 coup d'état known as the Incident at Gaoping Tombs, the Sima clan began to surpass the Cao clan's power in the kingdom. After Sima Yi's death in 251, Sima Yi's eldest son Sima Shi succeeded his father as regent of Cao Wei, maintaining the Sima clan's tight grip on the Cao Wei political scene. After Sima Shi's death in 255, Sima Yi's younger brother Sima Zhao became the regent of Cao Wei. Sima Zhao further assisted his clans' interests by suppressing rebellions and dissent. 

In 263, he directed Cao Wei forces in conquering Shu Han and capturing Liu Shan (the son of Liu Bei), marking the first demise of one of the Three Kingdoms. Sima Zhao's actions awarded him the title of King of Jin, the last achievable rank beneath that of emperor. He was granted the title because his ancestral home was located in Wen County, on the territory of the Zhou-era marchland and duchy named Jin, which was centered on Shaanxi's Jin River. Sima Zhao's ambitions for the throne were visible (proverbial in Chinese), but he died in 265 before any usurpation attempt could be made, passing the opportunity to his ambitious son, Sima Yan.

Western Jin (266–316)

Founding

The Jin dynasty was founded by Sima Yan, who was known posthumously as Emperor Wu (the "Martial Emperor of Jin"). After succeeding his father as the King of Jin and regent of Cao Wei in 265, Sima Yan declared himself emperor of the Jin dynasty in 266 and forced Cao Huan (the last ruler of Cao Wei) to abdicate. Emperor Wu (Sima Yan) permitted Cao Huan to live with honor as the Prince of Chenliu, and buried him with imperial ceremony. Under Emperor Wu, the Jin dynasty conquered Eastern Wu in 280 and united China proper, thus ending the Three Kingdoms period. The period of unity was relatively short-lived, as the Jin state was soon weakened by corruption, political turmoil, and internal conflicts. Emperor Wu's son Zhong, posthumously known as Emperor Hui (the "Benevolent Emperor of Jin"), was developmentally disabled.

Decline

 
Emperor Wu died in 290, and in 291 conflict over his succession caused the devastating War of the Eight Princes. The dynasty was greatly weakened by this civil conflict, and it soon faced more upheaval when the Uprising of the Five Barbarians began in 304. During this unrest, the Jin capital Luoyang was sacked by Han Zhao ruler Liu Cong in 311, and Jin emperor Sima Chi, posthumously known as Emperor Huai (the "Missing Emperor of Jin"), was captured and later executed. Emperor Huai's successor Sima Ye, posthumously known as Emperor Min (the "Suffering Emperor of Jin"), was then also captured and executed by Han Zhao forces when they seized Chang'an (present-day Xi'an) in 316. This event marked the end of the Western Jin. The surviving members of the Jin imperial family, as well as large numbers of Han Chinese from the North China Plain, subsequently fled to southern China. These refugees had a large impact on the lands they moved to—for example, they gave Quanzhou's Jin River its name when they settled in its valley in Fujian.

Material culture
The Jin dynasty is well known for the quality of its greenish celadon porcelain wares, which immediately followed the development of proto-celadon. Jar designs often incorporated animal, as well as Buddhist, figures. Examples of Yue ware are also known from the Jin dynasty.

Eastern Jin (317–420)

Establishment 

After the fall of Chang'an and the execution of Emperor Min of Jin, Sima Rui, posthumously known as Emperor Yuan, was enthroned as Jin emperor in 318. He reestablished the Jin government at Jiankang (present-day Nanjing), which became the dynasty's new capital. This marked the start of the Eastern Jin period. One of Sima Rui's titles was the prince of Langya, so the recently established northern states, who denied the legitimacy of his succession, occasionally referred to his empire as "Langya".

The Eastern Jin period witnessed the pinnacle of menfa ("gentry clans") politics. The authority of the emperors was limited, while national affairs were controlled by powerful immigrant elite clans like the Wang clans of Langya and Taiyuan, the Xie clan of Chenliu, the Huan clan of Qiao Commandery, and the Yu clan of Yingchuan. Among the people, a common remark was that "Wang Dao and Sima Rui, they dominate the nation together". It was said that when Emperor Yuan was holding court, he even invited Wang Dao to sit by his side so they could jointly accept congratulations from ministers, but Wang Dao declined the offer.

Wars with the north 

In order to recover the lands lost during the fall of the Western Jin, the Eastern Jin dynasty launched several military campaigns against the northern states, such as the expeditions led by Huan Wen from 354–369. Most notably, in 383, a heavily outnumbered Eastern Jin force inflicted a devastating defeat on the state of Former Qin at the Battle of Fei River. After this battle, the Former Qin—which had recently unified northern China—began to collapse, and the Jin dynasty recovered the lands south of the Yellow River. Some of these lands were later lost, but the Jin regained them once more when Liu Yu defeated the northern states in his northern expeditions of 409–416.

Despite successes against the northern states like the Battle of Fei River, paranoia in the royal family and a constant disruptions to the throne often caused loss of support for northern campaigns. For example, lack of support by the Jin court was a major cause of Huan Wen's failure to recover the north in his expeditions. Additionally, internal military crises—including the rebellions of generals Wang Dun and Su Jun, but also lesser fangzhen ("military command") revolts—plagued the Eastern Jin throughout its 104 year existence.

Mass migration to the south 
The local aristocrat clans of the south were often at odds with the immigrants from the north. As such, tensions increased, and rivalry between the immigrants and southern locals loomed large in the domestic politics of the Jin. Two of the most prominent local clans, the Zhou clan of Yixing and the Shen clan of Wuxing, were dealt a bitter blow from which they never quite recovered. There was also conflict between the various northern immigrant clans. This led to a virtual balance of power, which somewhat benefited the emperor's rule.

Special "commanderies of immigrants" and "white registers" were created for the massive amounts of northern Han Chinese who moved south during the Eastern Jin. The southern Chinese aristocracy was formed from the offspring of these migrants. Particularly in the Jiangnan region, Celestial Masters and the nobility of northern China subdued the nobility of southern China during the Jin dynasty. Southern China overtook the north in population due to depopulation of the north and the migration of northern Chinese to southern China. Different waves of migration of aristocratic Chinese from northern China to the south at different times resulted in distinct groups of aristocratic lineages.

Demise
In 403, Huan Xuan, the son of esteemed general Huan Wen, usurped the Jin throne and declared the dynasty of Huan Chu. Huan Xuan was soon toppled by Liu Yu, who reinstated Jin rule by installing Sima Dezong on the throne, posthumously known as Emperor An (the "Peaceful Emperor of Jin"). Meanwhile, the civilian administration suffered, as there were further revolts led by Sun En and Lu Xun, and Western Shu became an independent kingdom under Qiao Zong. In 419, Liu Yu had Sima Dezong strangled and replaced by his brother Sima Dewen, posthumously known as Emperor Gong (the "Respectful Emperor of Jin"). Finally, in 420, Sima Dewen abdicated in favor of Liu Yu, who declared himself the ruler of the new Song dynasty (which is referred to as the Liu Song dynasty by historians in order to prevent confusion with the Song dynasty established in 960). Sima Dewen was then asphyxiated with a blanket in the following year. In the north, Northern Liang, the last of the Sixteen Kingdoms, was conquered by the Northern Wei in 439, ushering in the Northern dynasties period.

The Xianbei Northern Wei accepted the Jin refugees Sima Fei and Sima Chuzhi. They both married Xianbei princesses. Sima Fei's wife was named Huayang, who was a daughter of Emperor Xiaowen; Sima Chuzhi's son was Sima Jinlong, who married a Northern Liang princess who was a daughter of Xiongnu King Juqu Mujian. More than fifty percent of Tuoba Xianbei princesses of the Northern Wei were married to southern Han Chinese men from the imperial families and aristocrats from southern China of the Southern dynasties who defected and moved north to join the Northern Wei. Much later, Sima Guang (1019–1086), who served as prime minister to the Song, claimed descent from the Jin dynasty (specifically, Sima Fu, brother of Sima Yi).

Government and demography

Qiaoren and Baiji 
The uprising of the five barbarians led to one in eight northerners migrating to the south. These immigrants were called "qiaoren (literally the lodged people)", accounting for one sixth of the then people living in the south. Considering most property of these refugees had been lost or exhausted as they arrived, they were privileged to be free from diao, a special poll tax that was paid via the silk or cotton cloth in ancient China, and other services. Their registers which were bound in white papers were called baiji. The ordinary ones which were bound in yellow papers were called huangji in comparison.

When the situation settled down, the preferential treatment not only was a heavy burden for the nation, but also aroused dissatisfaction from the natives. Hence, tu duan was an increasingly important issue for the Eastern Jin.

Lodged administrative divisions 
The Eastern Jin court established the lodged administrative divisions which served as strongholds of the qiaoren. More effective administration for them was a realistic starting point for that. Consisting of three levels: qiaozhou (the lodged province), qiaojun (the lodged commandery), and qiaoxian (the lodged county), these lodged administrative divisions were merely nominal without possessing actual domain, or rather, they were local government in exile; what could scarcely be denied was their significance in Jin's legitimacy for the northern territory as somewhat an announcement. Furthermore, it was also an action done to appease the refugees' homesickness, which was evoking their desire to resume what had been lost.

During the rule of Emperor Yuan, Emperor Ming, and Emperor Cheng, the lodged administrative divisions were concentrated in the area south of the Huai River and the Lower Yangtze Plain. At first there was the lodged Langya Commandery within lodged Fei County in Jiankang, but when it began is not exactly known. Then the lodged Huaide County was also established in Jiankang, around 320. According to the Book of Song:晉永嘉大亂，幽、冀、青、並、兗州及徐州之淮北流民，相率過淮，亦有過江在晉陵郡界者……又徙流民之在淮南者于晉陵諸縣，其徙過江南及留在江北者，並立僑郡縣以司牧之。徐、兗二州或治江北，江北又僑立幽、冀、青、並四州……(After Disaster of Yongjia, the refugees from You, Ji, Qing, Bing, Yan and Xu provinces came across the Huai River, some even came across the Yangtze River and stayed in Jinling Commandery... The lodged administrative divisions were established to govern them. The seats of Xu and Yan provinces perhaps were moved to the area north of the Yangtze River, where the lodged You, Ji, Qing, Bing provinces were established.)

The lodged Pei, Qinghe, Xiapi, Dongguang, Pingchang, Jiyin, Puyang, Guangping, Taishan, Jiyang, and Lu commanderies were established when Emperor Ming ruled. The rebellions and invasions occurring in Jianghuai area led to more refugees switching to settle in the south of the Yangtze River, where the lodged Huainan Commandery was established afterwards.

However, carrying these out was more complex than the policy was formulated. Several actual counties were under the jurisdiction of the lodged commanderies.

A few lodged administrative divisions are still retained in China nowadays. For instance, Dangtu County was originally located in the area of Bengbu, however, the lodged Dangtu County was established in where it is now, and the latter replaced the former, inheriting its place name.

Tu Duan policy 

The tu duan is the abbreviation for yi tu duan (means classifying people according to their present habitation to register). It was a policy to ensure the ancient hukou system working since the Western Jin. These terms were first recorded in the biographies of Wei Guan and Li Chong included in the Book of Jin:今九域同規，大化方始，臣等以為宜皆蕩除末法，一擬古制，以土斷，定自公卿以下，皆以所居為正，無復懸客遠屬異土者。然承魏氏凋弊之跡，人物播越，仕無常朝，人無定處，郎吏蓄於軍府，豪右聚於都邑，事體駁錯，與古不同。謂九品既除，宜先開移徙，聽相並就。且明貢舉之法，不濫於境外，則冠帶之倫將不分而自均，即土斷之實行矣。Hence, it was perhaps initially proposed by these two people, but was only seriously implemented during the Eastern Jin and the Southern dynasties.

Society and culture

Religion 

Taoism was polarized in the Jin dynasty. The Jin emperors repressed Taoists harshly, but also tried to exploit it, given the way it had been used near the end of the Han era in the poor peasants' revolts. Amidst the political turmoil of the era, many successful merchants, small landowners, and other moderately comfortable people found great solace in Taoist teachings and a number of major clans and military officers also took up the faith. Ge Hong emphasized loyalty to the emperor as a Taoist virtue; he even taught that rebels could never be Taoist immortals, which made Taoism more palatable to the imperial hierarchy. As a result, popular Taoist religions were considered heterodoxy while the official schools of the court were supported, but the popular schools like Tianshi Taoism were still secretly held dear and promulgated amongst ordinary people.

Disunity, disintegration, and chaos also made Buddhism more popular, in part due to the focus on addressing suffering. The Jin dynasty marked a critical era for Mahayana in China. Dharmarakṣa’s 286 translation of the Lotus Sutra was the most important one before Kumārajīva’s 5th-century translation. It was said that there were 1,768 Buddhist temples in the Eastern Jin.

Furthermore, Taoism advanced chemistry and medicine in China, whereas the contribution of Mahayana was concentrated in philosophy and literature.

List of emperors and eras

Major events 

 Battle of Fei River
 Butterfly Lovers
 War of the Eight Princes
 Wu Hu people

See also 

 Chinese sovereign
 Ge Hong
 List of tributaries of Imperial China
 Liu Song dynasty
 Northern dynasties
 Northern Wei dynasty
 Romance of the Three Kingdoms
 Six Dynasties
 Sixteen Kingdoms
 Southern dynasties

References

Citations

Sources

External links 

 Chinese History, the Jin Dynasty 晉
 Largest Jin Dynasty Tomb Discovered in NW China
 

 
Dynasties in Chinese history
Former countries in Chinese history
265 establishments
3rd-century establishments in China
420 disestablishments
5th-century disestablishments in China
Sixteen Kingdoms